Praemegaceros is an extinct genus of deer, known from the Pleistocene and Holocene of Western Eurasia. It contains the subgenera Praemegaceros, Orthogonoceros and Nesoleipoceros. It has sometimes been synonymised with Megaloceros and Megaceroides, however they have been found to be generically distinct.

P. obscurus is the earliest known species from the Early Pleistocene of Europe, and had long, crooked antlers. P. verticornis is an Early to Mid-Pleistocene species, closely related to P. obscurus, which lived throughout Southern Europe. The genus was widely distributed across Europe, West and Central Asia during the Early-Middle Pleistocene, with fossils having been discovered in France, Georgia, Germany, England, Greece, Israel, Italy, Romania, Russia Spain, Syria, and Tajikistan. The genus was extinct in mainland Europe and Asia by end of the Middle Pleistocene. An insular species, P. cazioti survived into the Late Pleistocene and Holocene in isolation on Sardinia until around 5500 BCE.

Taxonomy 

Praemegaceros was first described as a subgenus of Cervus by Portis in 1920, to include Cervus (Praemegaceros) dawkinsi. Kalkhe in 1956 named Orthogonoceros with the type species of Orthogonoceros (previously Cervus) verticornis. Kalkhe in 1965 recognised that these genera were synonyms, with Praemegaceros having priority. Radulesco & Samson in 1967 designated P. dawkinsi as the type species of the genus, while also naming the new genera Allocaenelaphus, Psecupsoceros, and Nesoleipoceros which are now recognised as synonyms of the genus.

Classification according to Croitor, 2018.

Subgenus Praemegaceros

Praemegaceros obscurus 
Known from the late Villafranchian of Europe (including Central Italy, Central Romania and Moldova) and the Near East, extending from the Cromer Forest Bed in England to Ubeidiya, Israel, Dmanisi, Georgia and the Azov region, Russia. Croitor suggests an origin in South Asia for this species, descended from taxa possibly referrable to Panolia sp. from the Siwaliks.

Praemegaceros dawkinsi 
Named in 1882 from remains from the Middle Pleistocene Cromer Forest Bed in Norfolk by Edwin Tulley Newton which were originally described in 1872 as belonging to P. verticornis by William Boyd Dawkins. The size is estimated to be around 220 kg, with a mesodont dentition. Croitor suggests that because the pedicles (base of the antlers) are robust and similar to those of giant deer, that P. dawkinsi represents a dwarfed form.

Praemegaceros mosbachensis 
Named by Wolfgang Soergel in 1927 for the species found in the lowest level of the Middle Pleistocene Mosbach locality in Germany. It was included in the “verticornis” group of Azzaroli's 1953 classification. It has been suggested to a be synonym of P. verticornis. However, Croitor suggests that these similarities are the result of parallel evolution, and proposes that P. mosbachensis represents an intermediate form between P. obscurus and P. dawkinsi.

Subgenus Nesoleipoceros

Praemegaceros sardous–Praemegaceros cazioti 
Endemic to Sardinia from the late Middle Pleistocene to the Early Holocene, the ancestor of P. cazioti appears to have dispersed to Sardinia during the Middle Pleistocene, with the earliest well dated records of Praemegaceros at Su Fossu de Cannas in Sardinia being over 450,000 years in age. Other early remains of the genus in Sardinia are referred to the species P. sardus/sardous. The oldest remains assigned to P. cazioti date to approximately 300,000 years ago. P. cazioti is smaller than P. sardus, being slightly larger than a fallow deer. The cranial morphology appears to be unaffected by the insular dwarfism. Two chronologically separated subspecies are known, which are suggested to be chronospecies. P. cazioti cazioti dates to the late Middle Pleistocene and Late Pleistocene and is characterised by smaller brachyodont teeth and P. cazioti algarensis from the end of the Late Pleistocene is larger than P. cazioti cazioti and is characterised by large mesodont upper cheek teeth, and a long premolar series, which are suggested to be adaptions for a grazing diet.

Praemegaceros solilhacus 
Named by Robert in 1930 for remains from Soleilhac, an early Middle Pleistocene site located in the Massif Central, France. The neotype specimen consists of a partial left frontal with an attached partial antler. The morphology of the preserved antler strongly resembles that of P. cazioti, which suggests a close relationship. Other known sites are from the early Middle Pleistocene of France, Germany, Italy, South Russia and Moldova. This taxon is suggested to be the largest species of Praemegaceros, with an estimated mass of 420 kg. The taxon appears to have been extinct by the late Middle Pleistocene.

Subgenus Orthogonoceros

Praemegaceros pliotarandoides 
Known from the late Early Pleistocene and Middle Pleistocene of Italy, North Greece, Moldova, South Ukraine and the Azov Sea Region. It was named by De Alessandri in 1903 for remains found in North Italy. Psekupsoceros orientalis is a junior synonym of the taxon.

Praemegaceros verticornis 
Named by William Boyd Dawkins in 1872 on the basis of a partial antler from the Cromer Forest Bed. Croitor suggests that Cervus belgrandi is a junior synonym. Known from late Early Pleistocene to Middle Pleistocene localities in England, Spain, France, Germany and Italy.

References

Prehistoric deer
Pleistocene even-toed ungulates
Pleistocene genus extinctions
Piacenzian first appearances
Pliocene even-toed ungulates
Prehistoric even-toed ungulate genera